31st Army Corps may refer to:
31st Army Corps (France)
31st Army Corps (Russian Empire)
31st Army Corps (Soviet Union)